The 2000 Kremlin Cup was a tennis tournament played on indoor carpet courts at the Olympic Stadium in Moscow in Russia that was part of the International Series of the 2000 ATP Tour and of Tier I of the 2000 WTA Tour. The  tournament was held from 23 October through 29 October 2000.

Finals

Men's singles

 Yevgeny Kafelnikov defeated  David Prinosil 6–2, 7–5
 It was Kafelnikov's 2nd title of the year and the 22nd of his career.

Women's singles

 Martina Hingis defeated  Anna Kournikova 6–3, 6–1
 It was Hingis's 8th title of the year and the 34th of her career.

Men's doubles

 Jonas Björkman /  David Prinosil defeated  Jiří Novák /  David Rikl 6–2, 6–3
 It was Björkman's 1st title of the year and the 21st of his career. It was Prinosil's 2nd title of the year and the 8th of his career.

Women's doubles

 Julie Halard-Decugis /  Ai Sugiyama defeated  Martina Hingis /  Anna Kournikova 4–6, 6–4, 7–6(5)
 It was Halard-Decugis's 10th title of the year and the 15th of her career. It was Sugiyama's 7th title of the year and the 16th of her career.

References

External links
 Official website 
 Official website 
 ATP Tournament Profile
 WTA Tournament Profile

Kremlin Cup
Kremlin Cup
Kremlin Cup
Kremlin Cup
Kremlin Cup
Kremlin Cup